Dave Kelly (born July 29, 1943) is a Canadian retired ice hockey goaltender.

Background 
Kelly was born in Toronto, Ontario. He played for several seasons in the Western Hockey League with the Portland Buckaroos. Kelly was a two-time winner of the WHL Outstanding Goaltender Award.

External links

References 

1943 births
Living people
Canadian ice hockey goaltenders
Los Angeles Blades (WHL) players
Portland Buckaroos players
San Diego Gulls (WHL) players
Ice hockey people from Toronto